Anantapur is a city in  the Indian state of Andhra Pradesh. It was a position of strategic importance for the British Indian Army during the Second World War. Due to this, there are many forts around the area with historical significance.

Tourist attractions

See also 
List of state protected Monuments in Andhra Pradesh

References 

Tourist attractions in Anantapur district
Lists of tourist attractions in Andhra Pradesh